Henry McKenzie (29 May 1855 – 13 November 1918) was a New Zealand cricketer. He played in one first-class match for Wellington in 1876/77.

See also
 List of Wellington representative cricketers

References

External links
 

1855 births
1918 deaths
New Zealand cricketers
Wellington cricketers
Cricketers from Wellington City